Kaknäs IP is the training ground of Djurgårdens IF. It houses two full-size pitches, one with grass and one with artificial grass.

References

Kaknäs
Djurgårdens IF Fotboll
Football in Stockholm